Horologion is a genus of ground beetles in the family Carabidae. This genus has a single species, Horologion speokoites. It is found in the United States.

References

Trechinae